University Canada West (UCW)  is a private, for-profit university in British Columbia, Canada. It  was founded in 2005 by David F. Strong, the former president of the University of Victoria. UCW was purchased in 2008 by the Eminata Group and in 2014 sold to Global University Systems, its present owners. Based in downtown Vancouver, the university offers undergraduate and graduate programs in business and management.

History

Initial years (2005 – 2008)
University Canada West was founded as a for-profit university by David Strong, the former president of the University of Victoria, and a group of investors. It was intended to cater to British Columbian students who had been turned away from the province's public universities as well as the Asian Pacific market and had projected an eventual enrollment of 3000 students. The establishment of the university marked the first time in British Columbia that a for-profit institution had been authorized to use the designation "university," the result of the province's recently enacted, controversial Degree Authorization Act. UCW was approved in 2004 and opened its doors in 2005 in the former Blanshard Elementary School in Victoria, British Columbia. It initially offered undergraduate degrees in commerce, communications, geography, tourism, and economics and a master's degree in business. However, the geography, tourism, and economics programs were later dropped.

In an effort to expand its program offerings, UCW bought Victoria College of Art in 2006. The intention was to start a Bachelor in Fine Arts degree. However, after the takeover, enrollment at the art college dropped drastically from 150 students to 12. The university subsequently withdrew its request to the British Columbia Degree Quality Assessment Board for approval for the new degree. UCW opened a second campus in Vancouver in 2008.

Eminata Group ownership (2008 – 2014)
In 2008, the university was sold to the Eminata Group. At the time of the sale, it was reported that UCW was teetering on the edge of bankruptcy and struggling to attract students. Faced with declining enrollment at its Victoria campus, the university closed the site in February 2011.  At the time of its closure the Victoria campus had only 24 students enrolled in academic degree programs. The announcement of the imminent closure was made one day after the deadline for a tuition refund had passed. The students were given the option of transferring to another college or to UCW's Vancouver campus. However, some students interviewed on CBC News said their preferred college was unwilling to transfer their UCW course credits, and they could not afford moving to Vancouver.

In March 2012, a two-part investigative feature in the British Columbian paper The Province reported on student complaints at UCW and two other Canadian colleges owned by Eminata. In October of that year, the Hindustan Times published an article reporting on interviews with over 30 students, graduates, faculty and former teachers and employees of UCW who "alleged that it [was] a university only in name, and that many of them were duped." The article noted that the university "vehemently" denied the allegations that the students were misled about the value of UCW degrees saying that it had many students who secured positions in industry and government, both in Canada and abroad. At the time of the article's publication, approximately 90% of UCW's students were from India. Earlier that year, when student complaints about UCW had begun to surface, India's Jawaharlal Nehru Technological University pulled out of a Memorandum of Understanding with UCW to jointly run an MBA exchange programme.

UCW's founder David Strong had been replaced as the university's president in December 2009. He was succeeded by Verna Magee-Shepherd, a former acting president of British Columbia Institute of Technology. Magee-Shepherd resigned in March 2012, and four months later Arthur Coren was named UCW's new president and vice-chancellor. Coren was previously the dean of Kwantlen Polytechnic University's business school.

Global University Systems ownership (2014 – present)
Eminata sold University Canada West to the Netherlands-based company Global University Systems in November 2014 at which time it had approximately 400 students enrolled in its in-person and online programs. According to a 2017 interview with Coren in The PIE News (an industry publication for the international education sector), the university's enrollment had increased since 2014 with 80% of its students coming from outside Canada. UCW had 52 graduates in the class of 2018. Of these, 23 were from India and the Far East, 10 from Canada, 7 from Africa, 4 from the Middle East, 4 from Europe, and 4 from Central and South America. The majority of the graduates were on the MBA program.

In 2019, Brock Dykeman was named new president of the University.

Campus
Earlier sited on two floors of an office building on Melville Street in downtown Vancouver, the university relocated in 2014 to the nearby London Building where it occupies five floors. The 10-storey London Building is located at 626 West Pender Street and was originally built in 1912 for the London and British North American Company.

University Canada West is set to open a new campus, Vancouver House, in July 2020, which will house 3,400 students.

Governance
In line with the bicameral system at many other Canadian universities, the governance structure of UCW is composed of an Academic Council and a Board of Governance. The Board of Governance oversees the strategic direction of the university including its fiduciary, legal and financial responsibilities. It is composed of two members nominated by Global University Systems (the university's owner), the university's president, and a minimum of four members external to both the university and its owner. As of 2018, the Board of Governance was chaired by Alfred Morris. He also serves on the board of directors at two other institutions owned by Global University Systems, Arden University and University of Law. The Academic Council oversees the university's academic programs and policies. It is composed of representatives from the university's staff, faculty, students and alumni.

Although UCW does not receive public funds, the British Columbia Ministry of Advanced Education requires the institution to file audited financial statements. The institution also undergoes an annual quality review by the Degree Quality Assessment Board.

Academics
The university is accredited by the British Columbia Ministry of Advanced Education, Skills & Training, and carries the Education Quality Assurance (EQA) accreditation under the 2003 Degree Authorization Act. The University is also a member of the British Columbia Council on Admission & Transfer. In 2017 the university's bachelors and post-graduate business degrees received accreditation by the Accreditation Council for Business Schools and Programs (ACBSP).

As of 2019 UCW offers a Bachelor of Commerce,  a Bachelor of Arts in Business Communication, and an MBA. The mode of study for these degrees is either full-time on campus or part-time online. It also offers an Associate of Arts degree.

References

External links

Universities in British Columbia
For-profit universities and colleges in Canada
Educational institutions established in 2005
2005 establishments in Canada